Colin Fickes is an American actor known for his recurring roles in One Tree Hill and Dawson's Creek.

Early life 
Fickes was born and raised in Raleigh, North Carolina. He attended Broughton High School, where he was a classmate of Nick Karner and actress Aubrey Dollar.

Career 
He is best known as high school teenager Jimmy Edwards on the hit series One Tree Hill. In one of the series' most notable episodes, the character committed suicide after bringing a gun to his school Tree Hill High, resulting in a hostage situation.

Fickes also appeared in the 2007 film Transformers. Additionally, he has appeared in several other feature films and made guest television appearances, including a recurring role on Dawson's Creek. In 2007, he appeared in The Go-Getter alongside Lou Taylor Pucci, Zooey Deschanel and Jena Malone.

Filmography

Film

Television

References

External links
 

American male film actors
American male television actors
Living people
Year of birth missing (living people)
Male actors from North Carolina
Actors from Raleigh, North Carolina
Needham B. Broughton High School alumni